Fluminense may refer to:

 Demonym of Rio de Janeiro (state), Brazil
 Fluminense Football Club, a Brazilian football (soccer) club
 Fluminense de Feira Futebol Clube, a Brazilian football (soccer) club
 Fluminense Futebol Clube (Araguari), a Brazilian football (soccer) club
 Fluminense Esporte Clube, a Brazilian football (soccer) club
 Guaynabo Fluminense FC, a Puerto Rican football (soccer) club
 Campeonato Fluminense, a Brazilian football (soccer) competition